Pakhi Sharma, famous as Bobby Darling and formerly known as Pankaj Sharma, is a trans, Indian actress active in Bollywood and regional Indian film industry.

Personal life
Pakhi Sharma was born in Delhi, India, as Pankaj Sharma. She is famously known as Bobby Darling. Coming out as a trans woman at a young age, she ran into problems with her family due to her gender identity. Her mother died when Darling was a teenager. She said in a 2009 interview that her appearance on the reality show Sacch Ka Saamna ("Facing the Truth"), the Indian version of the popular American show The Moment of Truth, helped reunite her with her father. The two were brought together on the show when her dad was the special surprise guest.

She has been a vocal supporter of LGBT rights.

In October 2015, Darling declared that she was going to marry Ramneek Sharma, a Bhopal-based businessman. The couple married in February 2016.

In September 2017, Darling filed for divorce against Ramneek Sharma, citing cheating, breach of trust, matrimonial cruelty and unnatural sex. In May 2018, Ramneek Sharma was arrested and sent to jail on charges of domestic violence. In a message, Bobby said, “This is to inform all my fans, friends and family that my husband was arrested by Delhi police on 11.5.18 and was in police custody for 4 days. Thereafter, he moved application for bail before Delhi courts which has been rejected. Justice is being meted out!”.

Awards
 2005, Best Supporting Actor/Actress, Monaco International Film Festival, (Monaco) for Navarasa

Filmography

Television

References

External links
 

Actresses from Delhi
Indian LGBT entertainers
Indian LGBT actors
LGBT Hindus
Indian film actresses
Actresses in Hindi cinema
Indian television actresses
Living people
Contestants on Indian game shows
Transgender actresses
Transgender female models
21st-century Indian actresses
Bigg Boss (Hindi TV series) contestants
Year of birth missing (living people)
21st-century Indian LGBT people